Vedde is a small town located in the Sorø Municipality in Region Sjælland on the island of Zealand (Sjælland) in east Denmark. As of 1 January 2022 it has a population of 266. 

The railway station was built in 1901 as part of the private Høng-Tølløse Railway ((HTJ) Høng-Tølløse Jernbane), but since January 2009 it is operated by the Regionstog A/S. Vedde was a junction between this and the subsequent action Sorø-Vedde Railway (1903–50).

References

Cities and towns in Region Zealand
Sorø Municipality